I'd Rather Write A Symphony is the sixth studio album and the second international release from Swedish singer/songwriter Ted Gärdestad. It was released in 1980 through the Polydor label in West Germany and The Netherlands, promoted by the single "Don't Treat Me This Way" backed with "Mindblower". An expanded and partly re-recorded version of the album was released as Stormvarning on the Polar Music label in Sweden the following year, the track "Love Light" is however only available on the international edition.

Two unreleased songs from the album sessions, the title track and "Nobody Loves You Now" saw their debut twenty years later as part of the 2001 4 CD boxed set Solregn.

I'd Rather Write A Symphony in its entirety remains unreleased on CD. However, all tracks are included in the 2009 8-CD box set Helt Nära Dig - Samlade Album.

Track listing
All lyrics written by Kenneth Gärdestad, music by Ted Gärdestad

Side A:
"Mindblower" ("Stormvarning")
"Don't Treat Me This Way"
"You Got Me Dancing"
"How Do You Wanna Make Love"
"The Reason"

Side B:
"Let the Sun Shine Through" ("Låt Solen Värma Dig")
"It's You"
"Love Light" 
"Slingan" 
"Down at the Zoo"

Personnel
 Ted Gärdestad - lead vocals, acoustic guitar, piano, keyboards, cymbals, strata
 Janne Schaffer - guitars
 Lasse Wellander - guitars
 Kjell Öhman - piano
 Björn J:son Lindh - piano, string arrangements
 Per-Erik Hallin - piano
 Wlodek Gulgowski - piano
 Rutger Gunnarsson - bass guitar
 Stefan Brolund - bass guitar
 Mike Watson - bass guitar
 Sam Bengtsson - bass guitar
 Åke Sundqvist - drums
 Per Lindvall - drums
 Ola Brunkert - drums
 Lennart Östlund - strata
 Ulf Andersson - saxophone
 Tomas Ledin - backing vocals
 Mikael Rickfors - backing vocals
 Annica Boller - backing vocals
 Diana Nunez - backing vocals
 Maritza Horn - backing vocals
 Liza Öhman - backing vocals
 Py Bäckman - backing vocals
 Agneta Olsson - backing vocals
 Lasse Westman - backing vocals

Production 
 Ted Gärdestad - producer
 Lennart Östlund - producer
 Janne Schaffer - producer
 Leif Mases - sound engineer
 Lennart Östlund - sound engineer
 Recorded at Polar Studios, Stockholm

Release history 
 Polydor Records 2344 164, (West Germany & The Netherlands), 1980

Sources and external links 
 Official home page, The Ted Gärdestad Society
 Liner notes I'd Rather Write A Symphony, Ted Gärdestad, Polydor 2344 164, 1980.

1980 albums
Ted Gärdestad albums